The Sufid dynasty was a Turkic dynasty, of Mongolic origin, that ruled in Khwarezm within the realm of Mongols' Golden Horde Khanate, in the Amu Darya river delta. Although the dynasty's independence was short-lived (c. 1361 – 1379), its later members continued to rule Khwarezm intermittently as governors of the Timurid Empire until the takeover of Khwarezm by the Shaybanid Uzbeks in 1505. Unlike earlier dynasties that ruled from Khwarezm, the Sufids never used the title of Khwarezmshah.

Origins
The progenitor of the Sufi dynasty was Naghday Biy, a Mongol noble and a member of the Onggirat tribe. The dynasty had several genealogical links to the Borjigin imperial family; it was descended from a brother of Genghis Khan's chief empress Börte, and both the paternal grandfather and great-grandfather of Naghday were the sons of Mongol princesses. Initially serving as the chief army commander of Öz Beg Khan, Naghday later resigned his post and became a Sufi before migrating to Khwarezm, becoming the first Onggirat chief in the region.

History

Husain Sufi

After the annexation of Khwarezm into the Mongol Empire in the early 13th century, it had become divided into two parts. The northern half went to the khans of the White Horde, while the southern half fell into the hands of the ulus of Chagatai. This division remained in place until the 1350s, when the Sufid dynasty took power in Khwarezm.

The first Sufid ruler Husain Sufi, a son of Naghday, was a member of the Onggirat, a constituent tribe of the White Horde. Husain Sufi took control of Urgench  and the rest of the northern part of Khwarezm; coins in the province were minted for him beginning in 1364. He also took advantage of the troubles plaguing Transoxiana at the time by seizing Kath and Khiva, which were allocated to the Chagatai khans.

This encroachment on what was considered to be Chagatai territory ultimately led to conflict with the amir Timur. At the time of the seizure of Kath and Khiva Transoxiana had lacked a ruler who could respond, but by 1369 Timur had unified the region under his rule. Timur, who maintained a puppet Chagatai khan, felt strong enough to demand the return of Kath and Khiva from Husain Sufi in the early 1370s.

Husain Sufi's refusal to return southern Khwarezm caused Timur to go to war against him in 1372. Kath was quickly overrun; Husain Sufi decided to fortify Urgench and remain there. Urgench was surrounded by Timur's army and Husain Sufi died during the siege.

Yusuf Sufi

Husain Sufi was succeeded by his brother, Yusuf Sufi, who concluded a peace with Timur in which Timur received Kath and Khiva. Timur's army left northern Khwarezm; in the following year, however, Yusuf Sufi provoked Timur by invading his territories and trying to retake Kath and Khiva. This led Timur to undertake a second campaign against him in 1373, but Yusuf Sufi quickly sent his apologies and gave his daughter Khanzada Begum in marriage to Timur's son Jahangir in exchange for peace.

Yusuf Sufi's continuing incursions into Timur's territory prompted another invasion in 1379. This time Urgench was besieged; Yusuf Sufi died in the middle of the siege and Timur demanded the city's surrender. The city refused; as a result when Timur's army finally did capture it by force, a general massacre followed and the city was burned.

Suleiman Sufi

The Sufids' defeat at the hands of Timur did not shake their desire to retain their hold on Khwarezm. Suleiman Sufi allied with the khan of the Golden Horde, Tokhtamysh, and in 1387 revolted in concert with the khan's invasion of Transoxiana. Timur immediately took action against Suleiman Shah, overrunning Khwarezm and crushing the rebellion.

Later Sufids

Despite their loss of independence, the Sufids continued to play an influential role in the Timurid Empire. In the late 14th century one Yayïq Sufi is mentioned; a probable member of the Sufid line, Yayïq Sufi obtained a high position in Timur's army. He rebelled in 1393/4, but was defeated and imprisoned.

In the 15th century Khwarezm was usually controlled by the Timurids, although it on occasion fell into the hands of the khans of the Golden Horde as well as the Uzbeks. The Sufids retained some power in the province, with individual members acting as governors for the powers of the region. In 1464 an 'Uthman b. Muhammad Sufi is mentioned. In 1505, a Chin Sufi was in charge of the province, but in that year the Uzbek Muhammad Shaybani invaded Khwarezm and annexed the province. Uzbek Khanate was defeated by Safavids and Khwarezm was occupied by Persians between 1510 and 1511. Finally, Uzbeks and Turkmens won independence war of 2 years against them and founded second Uzbek state, Khanate of Khiva.

Rulers
Aq Sufii (1359–1361)
Husain (1361–1372)
Yusuf (1372–1379)
Balankhi (1380)
Maing (1380)
Sulayman (1380–1388)

See also 
List of medieval Mongol tribes and clans
Turkic peoples
List of Turkic dynasties and countries

Notes

References

Further reading

History of Uzbekistan
History of Turkmenistan
Turkic dynasties
14th century in Asia